Sanem is a commune and town in south-western Luxembourg. It is part of the canton of Esch-sur-Alzette.  The administrative centre and largest town is Belvaux.

, the town of Sanem, which lies in the north of the commune, has a population of 2,397.  Other towns within the commune include Belvaux, Ehlerange, and Soleuvre.

Population

Sanem Castle
Sanem Castle has a history dating back to the 13th century. Today's building was completed in 1557 after the medieval castle had been partly destroyed. The castle still maintains much of its original character.

Twin towns — sister cities

Sanem is twinned with:
 Chauffailles, France

See also
 List of mayors of Sanem

References

External links
 
 Commune of Sanem official website

 
Communes in Esch-sur-Alzette (canton)
Towns in Luxembourg